The Marcel Loncin Research Prize was established in 1994. It is awarded by the Institute of Food Technologists (IFT) in even-numbered years to fund basic chemistry, physics, and/or engineering research applied to food processing and improving food quality. It is named for Marcel Loncin (1920-1995), a Belgian-born, French chemical engineer who did food engineering research while a professor at the Centre d'Enseignement et de Recherches des Industries Alimentaries (CERIA) and afterwards at the Food Engineering Department of the Universität Karlsruhe (TH), Germany. It was the third and final IFT award as of 2006 that has been named for a then-living person.

Award winners receive USD 50,000 in two annual installments and a plaque from the Marcin Loncin Endowment Fund of the IFT.

Winners

References
Mermelstein, N.H. "The Man Behind The Prize." Food Technology. December 2006. p. 23.

External links

Marcel Loncin Research Prize - Official site

Food technology awards